Anderson Rodney de Oliveira (born 23 December 1980, in São Paulo), known as Babù, is a Brazilian football coach and former player. He is currently an assistant coach at Casertana.

Playing career

Early career
A forward, Babù started his career off in Italy, being noted by Zdeněk Zeman in 2001 during a youth football tournament in Rome; as Zeman was head coach of Serie B side Salernitana at the time, he had him signed for the club. He made a total of 27 appearances in 2 seasons, scoring 3 goals for the Salerno based club. In 2003, he moved to recently relegated Serie A side Venezia, where Babù played in 21 games, but failed to score a single goal in his single Serie B season with the club. In 2004, he was purchased by Serie A side Lecce, rejoining Zeman as head coach, where he would spend the next 3 seasons. He managed to score 6 goals in 47 total appearances for the central Italian club. Following his longest spell with one team as a professional footballer, he was signed by then Serie B side Hellas Verona F.C. in 2007. He stayed for just under one season and made just 12 appearances scoring just once.

Catania
Following his short stint in Verona, he signed for Sicilian giants Calcio Catania, where he found it hard to find any playing time making just two substitute appearances, not scoring. Hence he was sent on loan to Triestina, where he would remain for the remaining six months of the season.
He spent the entire 2008–09 season on loan at Avellino, in the Italian Serie B, yet he only managed seven appearances and a single goal. He was released by mutual consent in July 2009.

Coaching career
On 30 December 2022, Babù joined Casertana as an assistant to newly appointed head coach Vincenzo Cangelosi, former long-time assistant of Zdeněk Zeman.

References

External links
 Brazilian FA archive
 Profile at Gazzetta.it

Brazilian footballers
Brazilian expatriate footballers
Catania S.S.D. players
U.S. Salernitana 1919 players
Venezia F.C. players
U.S. Lecce players
Hellas Verona F.C. players
U.S. Triestina Calcio 1918 players
U.S. Avellino 1912 players
Atletico Roma F.C. players
Serie A players
Serie B players
Expatriate footballers in Italy
Brazilian expatriate sportspeople in Italy
Association football forwards
Association football wingers
Footballers from São Paulo
1980 births
Living people